Joe Kovacs (Born Joseph Stephen Kovacs; December 15, 1967) is an American puppeteer and actor.

Kovacs was born in Independence, Ohio. In 2006 and 2007, Kovacs handled the puppet Madame, including a performance on VH1's I Love the '70s.

References

1967 births
American puppeteers
Living people
People from Independence, Ohio
Male actors from Ohio